Mount Sandel Fort is an Iron Age fort in Coleraine, County Londonderry, Northern Ireland. The remains of the fort are located close to the Mount Sandel Mesolithic site. Mount Sandel Fort mound is a State Care Historic Monument in the townland of Mount Sandel, in Coleraine Borough Council area, at Grid Ref: C8530 3070.

12th century
The fort was used as a residence of John de Courcy.

See also
Mount Sandel Mesolithic site

References

Archaeological sites in County Londonderry
Coleraine
Former populated places in Northern Ireland
Northern Ireland Environment Agency properties
Military history of County Londonderry